Aldea del Fresno is a municipality of the autonomous community of the Community of Madrid in central Spain.

Aldea del Fresno goes from north to south along the Alberche river.

References

External links 

Municipalities in the Community of Madrid